Clavatula milleti is a species of sea snail, a marine gastropod mollusk in the family Clavatulidae.

Description
The size of an adult shell varies between 15 mm and 55 mm.

The color of the shell is whitish, or yellowish flesh-color, or brown. It is more or less decussated by longitudinal and revolving engraved lines, sometimes forming granulations especially on the spire The revolving lines are prominent on the body whorl, where the longitudinal ones are usually subobsolete.

Distribution
This species occurs in the Atlantic Ocean along West Africa (Senegal)

References

 Petit de la Saussaye, S. (1851) Notice sur un groupe de coquilles classées parmi les Fuseaux (Fusus Lam.), avec la description de plusieurs espèces. Journal de Conchyliologie, 2, 73–79, 2 pls. page(s): 78, pl. 2 fig.
 Fischer-Piette, E., 1950. Listes des types décrits dans le Journal de Conchyliologie et conservés dans la collection de ce journal. Journal de Conchyliologie 90: 8-23

External links
 

milleti
Gastropods described in 1851